A risk management information system (RMIS) is an information system that assists in consolidating property values, claims, policy, and exposure information and providing the tracking and management reporting capabilities to enable the user to monitor and control the overall cost of risk management.

Overview

The management of risk data and information is key to the success of any risk management effort regardless of an organization's size or industry sector.  Risk management information systems/services (RMIS) are used to support expert advice and cost-effective information management solutions around key processes such as:
 Risk identification and assessment
 Risk control
 Risk financing

Typically, RMIS facilitates the consolidation of information related to insurance, such as claims from multiple sources, property values, policy information, and exposure information, into one system.   Often, RMIS applies primarily to “casualty” claims/loss data systems.  Such casualty coverages include auto liability, auto physical damage, workers' compensation, general liability and products liability.

RMIS products are designed to provide their insured organizations and their brokers with basic policy and claim information via electronic access, and most recently, via the Internet. This information is essential for managing individual claims, identifying trends, marketing an insurance program, loss forecasting, actuarial studies and internal loss data communication within a client organization. They may also provide the tracking and management reporting capabilities to enable one to monitor and control overall cost of risk in an efficient and cost-effective manner.

In the context of the acronym RMIS, the word “risk” pertains to an insured or self-insured organization. This is important because prior to the advent of RMIS, insurance company loss information reporting typically organized loss data around insurance policy numbers. The historical focus on insurance policies detracted from a clear, coherent and consolidated picture of a single customer's loss experience. The advent of the first PC and UNIX based standalone RMIS was in 1982, by Mark Dorn, under the trade name RISKMASTER. This began a breakthrough step in the insurance industry's evolution toward persistent and focused understanding of their end-customer needs.   Typically, the best solution for an organization depends on whether it is enhancing an existing RMIS system, ensuring the highest level of data quality, or designing and implementing a new system while maintaining a focus on state-of-the-art technology.

Common types of RMIS

Most major insurance companies (carriers), broker/agents, and third-party administrators (TPAs) offer or provide at least one external RMIS product to their insureds (clients) and any brokers involved in the insurance program.  Most commonly, RMIS products allow individual claim detail look-up, basic trend report production, policy summaries and ad hoc queries. The resulting information can then be shared throughout the client's organization, usually for insurance program cost allocation, loss prevention and effective claim management at the local level. More advanced products allow multiple claim data sources to be consolidated into one “Master RMIS,” which is essential for most large client organizations with complex insurance programs.

The primary users of RMIS are risk/insurance departments of insured organizations and any insurance broker involved. It is much less common for the insured's safety department and vehicle operations department to have access to RMIS despite similar interest in the data. In fact, safety and vehicle operations of larger organizations typically maintain their own separate database systems of “accidents/incidents,” many of which will correlate to RMIS claim data.

Insurance companies normally use a different version of externally provided RMIS for internal use, such as by underwriting and loss control personnel. Occasionally, there could be timing or other differences that could cause data discrepancies between the internal system and externally provided RMIS.

Insurance brokers have a similar need for access to their insured client's claim data. Brokers are normally added as an additional user to the RMIS product provided to their clients by the insurance carrier and TPAs. The information available from RMIS is critical to the broker for interfacing effectively with their counterparts in the insurance carrier and TPAs. Additionally, effectively presented RMIS information that shows trends and analysis is essential to successfully marketing their clients' insurance programs.

Insurance carrier and a TPA claim adjusters traditionally use claims management systems to collect and manage claim information and to administer claims. Some client organizations, however, may choose to manage certain types of claims or those within a loss retention layer and thus use this type of system as well.

Typically, the claims management system provides the primary data to RMIS products. RMIS products in turn provide an externally accessed view into the client's claims data. RMIS products are commonly available directly from larger insurance carriers and TPAs, but the most advanced systems are often offered by independent RMIS vendors. Independent RMIS vendor systems are most desirable when a client organization needs to consolidate claims data from multiple current insurance programs and/or past programs with current program information.

Key vendor attributes and differences 

Along with insurance carriers, broker/agents and TPAs that offer their own proprietary systems, there are a variety of direct RMIS technology companies who sell to direct insureds and even the carriers, broker/agents and TPAs themselves.

Major differences among RMIS vendors include:
Currency of technology (Internet-based vs. Internet-accessible);
System speed (response time for screen changes, report generation time, etc.);
Flexibility in meeting client requirements (custom screen views, client-defined data fields, special reports, etc.);
Ongoing support service quality (availability of senior/quality technical support, help desk availability, dedicated staff and stability, etc.);
Data quality control (data conversion accuracy, data source cleanup, etc.);
Pricing (first-year cost, ongoing cost, custom programming charges, data record storage fees);
Availability of related modules (property exposure management, policy management, claim/incident setup, occupational safety and health administration (OSHA) record keeping, claims audits, etc.);
Turnaround time for data loads;
Foreign conversion/support (financial fields, language, fluent support staff, etc.)
Fraud detection technology built for the industry, identifies and assesses the risks which your business is vulnerable to during a transaction.

RMIS system compatibility varies among carriers, broker/agents and TPAs. However, quality independent RMIS vendors by design can take almost any claim data source and convert or map the data to their particular system's file structure. A few major insurance carriers offer similar consolidation services, i.e., combining the insured client's current claim data with another carrier's or TPA's data for the same insured client. The other data sources can be for current separate insurance programs or from expired insurance programs. Usually, this type of consolidation service is performed to accommodate their major policyholder organizations. Major TPAs, however, more commonly offer such data consolidation services.

Average costs and market drivers

The cost of a typical independent RMIS product varies from company to company. More costly full-featured products are sometimes available with more advanced reporting systems. The products are usually priced on a per-user basis on a sliding scale for a larger number of users. Insured clients' brokers are given access at no cost or occasionally for a flat annual fee for multiple insured clients with a particular broker.

TPAs commonly include one or two RMIS access IDs within their claims management pricing to encourage both the client's broker and the client to use their claim look-up product. Normally, beyond the first two access IDs, the pricing follows the same per-user range of the insurance companies.  The cost drivers of RMIS include:
  Number of user/access IDs
  Number of outside claim data sources that must be converted (carriers and TPAs do not have to convert their own data)
  Frequency of outside claim data updates
  Special programming/report development charges
  Training of users (initial and annual users' conferences)

Higher cost systems do not always correlate to better performance in terms of both usefulness and speed. While most carrier and TPA RMIS systems are similarly priced, the independent RMIS vendors' price range varies significantly, as previously mentioned.

See also 
 Knowledge management
 Risk management

References

External links
Aon eSolutions (2013) http://www.aon-esolutions.com/guide , Definitive Guide to a Risk Management Information System
 Hanson, David. (2005) Risk Management Information Systems Defined, American Society of Safety Engineers
 Duden, David and Geaglone, Peter. (2006) For Risk Managers – Enterprise Risk Systems Compared , Risk & Insurance Technology Magazine

Information systems
Project management software
Risk management in business